In enzymology, a glycoprotein N-palmitoyltransferase is an enzyme that catalyzes the chemical reaction

palmitoyl-CoA + glycoprotein  CoA + N-palmitoylglycoprotein

Thus, the two substrates of this enzyme are palmitoyl-CoA and glycoprotein, whereas its two products are CoA and N-palmitoylglycoprotein.

This enzyme belongs to the family of transferases, specifically those acyltransferases transferring groups other than aminoacyl groups.  The systematic name of this enzyme class is palmitoyl-CoA:glycoprotein N-palmitoyltransferase. This enzyme is also called mucus glycoprotein fatty acyltransferase.  This enzyme participates in aminosugars metabolism.  This enzyme has at least one effector, Dithiothreitol.

References

 

EC 2.3.1
Enzymes of unknown structure